Čivićevac is a perennial stream in Koprivnica-Križevci County, Croatia, flowing near the center of the town of Đurđevac. It is a minor right-bank tributary of the Drava.

References

Rivers of Croatia
Landforms of Koprivnica-Križevci County